The Organic Statute of the Kingdom of Poland was a statute which replaced the Constitution of 1815 in the aftermath of the failed November Uprising in the Russian Partition of Poland. The Statute was pronounced in occupied Warsaw on March 13/25, 1832 by Marshal Ivan Fyodorovich Paskevich, appointed Namiestnik of the Kingdom of Poland. To commemorate the Tsar's crushing of the Cadet Revolution, Alexander Pushkin wrote "On the Taking of Warsaw", hailing the capitulation of Poland's capital as the "final triumph" of Mother Russia. Other writers joined in to celebrate.

The Statute, signed by Emperor Nicholas I, replaced the personal union between the Kingdom of Poland and the Russian Empire with the "eternal incorporation" of Poland into Russia (a point that had actually been stated in the first article of the 1815 Constitution). The Parliament of the Kingdom was abolished, and its army merged with the Russian Army.

Remaining resemblances of autonomy left without change by the Statute included the Council of State, the Administrative Council, and the Bank of Poland. Out of five governmental commissions, two (military and religious/educational) were dissolved (leaving only treasury, justice and internal affairs). The power of the Namiestnik of Poland was increased.

Notes

References
 Tomasz Demidowicz, Statut Organiczny Królestwa Polskiego w latach 1832-1856 Czasopismo Prawno-Historyczne, Vol LXII, 2010; Zeszyt 1. Retrieved January 23, 2013.
 "Dziennik Praw Królestwa Polskiego" 1832 Tom 14, nr 55, str. 160–249
 "Dziennik Powszechny" Nr 83 z 26 III 1832, s. 339-342

1832 documents
1832 in law
1832 in Poland
1832 in the Russian Empire
Legal history of Poland
Political history of Poland
Government of Congress Poland
Nicholas I of Russia